Sylvester Magee (claimed May 29, 1841 – October 15, 1971) claimed to be the last living former American slave. He received much publicity and was accepted for treatment by the Mississippi Veterans Hospital as a veteran of the American Civil War. If this claim were true, Magee would not only have been the last surviving American Civil War veteran, but the oldest recorded person to have ever lived.

Life
Magee claimed to have been born in North Carolina in 1841 to slaves Ephraim and Jeanette, who were held and worked on the J.J. Shanks plantation. He said that he was purchased at the age of 19, just before the American Civil War, by plantation owner Hugh Magee at a slave market in Enterprise, Mississippi. Hugh Magee owned the Lone Star Plantation in Covington County, Mississippi. Sylvester adopted the Magee surname, a common practice among enslaved people at the time. Shortly afterward, he was sold again, to Victor Steen of Rankin County, Mississippi.

Magee claimed that in 1863, he ran away from the Steen plantation and enlisted in the Union Army, taking part in the assault on Vicksburg, Mississippi. 

Magee claimed to have been forced to serve in both the Confederate and Union armies as a servant and laborer. No documentary evidence has been found for this. Alfred P. Andrews, founder of the Jackson Civil War Round Table and its president elect for 1965-66, helped Magee be classified as a Civil War veteran although no service records for him could be found. In March 1966, when Magee was suffering from pneumonia, Andrews helped him obtain treatment from the Mississippi Veterans Hospital. 

On Magee's purported 124th birthday, the citizens of Collins, Mississippi held a party at a country grocery store, complete with a five-layer cake and 124 candles. Governor Paul B. Johnson, Jr. declared it "Sylvester Magee Day". Many national news articles reported on Magee's life and longevity, including Time and Jet. He appeared on the Mike Douglas Show and was flown to Philadelphia, Pennsylvania for another televised appearance. He was proclaimed as the oldest living United States citizen by a life insurance company and received a birthday card from President Lyndon B. Johnson, and was also recognized by president Richard M. Nixon.

Jet wrote that, according to historians, "it would have been impossible for a person who neither reads nor writes to have related the stories of the Civil War in such detail as Magee without having served in the conflict". Jet quoted a historian who stated that Magee talked with "rare intelligence and seldom rambled" in telling of his participation in the Civil War.

Magee had four wives, three of whom he outlived. He fathered 7 children, the last at the purported age of 107. His father reportedly lived to 123, his mother to 122. In a 1966 interview, he stated that he had never drunk alcohol, not uttered a swear word, although he smoked cigarettes for 108 years. In his later years he made a living selling automated needles and digging graves. In 1966, he divorced his wife Marie.

Death and age
On October 15, 1971, Sylvester Magee died in Columbia, Mississippi. His funeral was held at John the Baptist Missionary Church on October 19, 1971. He was buried in an unmarked grave in the Pleasant Valley Church Cemetery in nearby Foxworth, Mississippi. In 2011, the Marion County Historical Society provided a marker.

Magee's purported age of 130 has never been verified, as persons born into slavery typically lacked birth certificates. History professor Max Grivno, who has studied Magee's life, characterized the claimed age as "possible ... but extremely unlikely," noting that there was "only one documented case of a person living into their 120s."

See also

Longevity claims
Slavery in the United States
List of the last surviving American slaves
Alfred "Teen" Blackburn (died 1951), one of the last surviving enslaved Americans
Cudjoe Lewis (died 1935), one of the last survivors of the trans-Atlantic slave trade
Eliza Moore (died 1948), one of the last living African Americans proven to have been born into slavery in the United States.
Charlie Smith (died 1979), another individual who claimed to be a supercentenarian born into slavery, who died later than Magee

References

Sources
Bobbie E. Barbee and Leahmon L. Reid, "Why 125-Year-Old Husband Sues for Divorce", Jet Magazine, March 30, 1967, pp. 46–49
"Gerontology: Secret of Long Life", Time Magazine, 14 July 1967
"Funeral Services Held Tuesday For The Last American Slave", Columbian-Progress obituary, October 21, 1971
"America’s Oldest Citizen Dies in Mississippi at 130", Jet, 4 November 1971, p. 10, reprinted in

External links

"124-Year Old Former Slave Believed To Be Last Survivor of Civil War", Ocala Star-Banner, May 31, 1965. 
1965 Press Photo of Magee
"Divorced: Sylvester Magee", Jet Magazine, May 11, 1967, p. 46.
"Black Confederates", by Charles Kelly Barrow, p. 80.
Alfred P. Andrews Sylvester Magee Research Collection, Special Collections at the University of Southern Mississippi. 

People of Mississippi in the American Civil War
1971 deaths
People from Clarke County, Mississippi
People from Columbia, Mississippi
People from Florence, Mississippi
African-American centenarians
American centenarians
Men centenarians
Year of birth uncertain
Baptists from Mississippi
People from Hattiesburg, Mississippi
Longevity myths